Sa'adatu Modibbo Kawu is a Nigerian politician who serves as the Commissioner for Tertiary Education, Science and Technology, Kwara State, appointed by governor Abdulrazaq Abdulrahman.

Early life and education 
In 1997 she studied economics at Usmanu Danfodiyo University Sokoto and then obtained a Masters in Business Administration from the University of Ilorin, Ilorin.

Career 
As Commissioner for Tertiary Education, Science and Technology,  1.592 billion Naira was spent to clear the arrears of salaries to transform education in the State.

Personal life 
She is married to the ex-director-general of the National Broadcasting Commission, Ishaq Modibbo Kawu. She has 5 children.

See also 
 Kwara State Executive Council

References

External links 
 

Living people
Nigerian women in politics
Kwara State politicians
Year of birth missing (living people)